Estero Bureo a small river on the Pacific coast of the Tomé commune, Concepcion Province, Biobío Region of Chile north of Penco and south of the Itata River. The Buero surrounds by a meander the city of Mulchén on all sides except the south.

External links
  Estero Bureo, Concepcion, Tome

Rivers of Chile
Rivers of Biobío Region